American singer Mariah Carey has undergone thirteen tours, four residencies, along with numerous one-off concerts and televised performances. Carey did not do a significant amount of public performing in her early years in the music industry, partially due to stage fright. Despite this she still made appearances and performed at the 33rd Annual Grammy Awards and on Saturday Night Live. One of her first significant performances was at MTV Unplugged, which received positive reception as Carey silenced critics saying her vocals were studio-made. From 1993 to 2000, Carey toured for her albums: Music Box, Daydream, Butterfly and Rainbow.

In 2001, Carey did not tour for the soundtrack to her film Glitter due to being hospitalized for "extreme exhaustion". Her first performance after her 'breakdown' was a performance of "Hero" at America: A Tribute to Heroes. After the release of her ninth studio album Charmbracelet, Carey embarked another tour which targeted "arenas that typically house between 10,000 and 20,000 fans." She eventually toured for The Emancipation of Mimi, Memoirs of an Imperfect Angel, Me. I Am Mariah... The Elusive Chanteuse and Caution. She failed to tour for her eleventh studio album, E=MC², due to being pregnant at the time. She cancelled the tour but suffered a miscarriage two months later. Outside of promoting her albums, Carey has undergone an Australian Tour in 2013 to promote her single, "Triumphant (Get 'Em)". In 2016, she went on The Sweet Sweet Fantasy Tour in Europe which was featured heavily in her reality show, Mariah's World. During the summer of the following year, Carey went on a joint tour with Lionel Richie. To kick off promotion for Caution, Carey embarked on an tour through Asia with the intent to also tour Oceania but was later cancelled due to scheduling conflicts.

Among tours, Carey has had and performed at five concert residencies. This included Live at the Pearl which was a four-evening promotional concert residency in 2009. Her first residency began in 2014 and was entitled All I Want for Christmas Is You: A Night of Joy and Festivity. The residency began on December 15, 2014, and continued through to December 15, 2019, after completing eight legs and fifty-six shows. In 2015, to support the release of her compilation album #1 to Infinity, Carey embarked on her second concert residency. The show featured all eighteen of Carey's US number-one singles at the time in chronological order. Carey's fourth residency, The Butterfly Returns, began in 2018 and continued until 2020. In 2022, Carey performed a four-day special concert, Mariah Carey: Merry Christmas To All! at Scotiabank Arena and Madison Square Garden from December 9 to 16.

Throughout her career, Carey has many notable live performances. At the 1990 NBA Finals, Carey performed "America the Beautiful" in which Rolling Stone writer, Brittany Spanos, stated the players were struck "with awe by the incredible talent of a burgeoning young star". In 2002, Carey performed "The Star-Spangled Banner" at the Super Bowl XXXVI which was called a "stunning rendition" by Billboard. She also performed "When You Believe" with Whitney Houston at the 71st Academy Awards which also went on to win the Academy Award for Best Original Song the same evening. Despite being called a "show stopper" and "the 1990s pop phenomenon", Carey's New Year's Eve performance in Times Square, New York City on December 31, 2016, received backlash after an "audio track malfunction" according to CNN. A year later in 2017, Carey took to the stage and "redeemed" herself according to Billboard, ABC and CNN with her performance being called "triumphant" and "far superior to her [previous] effort". In 2021 on Valentine's Day, Carey performed a remix of her song "We Belong Together" which NME called "a sultry Valentine's Day gift" and called Carey the "undisputed Queen of Holidays".

Concert tours

Concert residencies

Televised performances

Only performances in which dates are known are listed below.

Mariah Carey era (1990–91)

Emotions era (1991–92)

Music Box era (1993–94)

Daydream era (1995–96)

Butterfly era (1997–98)

#1's era (1998–99)

Rainbow era (1999–2000)

Glitter era (2001–02)

Charmbracelet era (2002–04)

The Emancipation of Mimi era (2005–06)

E=MC² era (2008–09)

Memoirs of an Imperfect Angel era (2009)

Merry Christmas II You era (2010/12)

Me. I Am Mariah... The Elusive Chanteuse era (2013–14)

#1 to Infinity era (2015–17)

Caution era (2018–19)

Current era (2020–present)

References

Bibliography

Notes

Carey, Mariah